Wašíču (Lakȟótiyapi) or waṡicu (Dakhótiyapi) is the Siouan word for "white person", "white man", or "non-Indian." It expresses the Indigenous population's perception of non-Natives' relationship with the land and the Indigenous peoples. While it commonly refers to white people and the language they speak, the definition is based on behavior, and does not specifically mention skin color or race.

Origins
In Lakȟótiyapi, wašin icu means "takes the fat". This is believed by many to be the origin of the phrase being applied to non-Natives, notably white people, as they collectively robbed tribes of their resources. Wasicu is currently used in the Lakota language for white people as well as for the English language.

In Dakhótiyapi, Waṡicu iapi means the English language. In current usage, waṡicu is used for "white man" and waṡicu ha sapa for "African-American".

See also
Cracker
Pākehā

References

 LaFontaine, Harlan and Neil McKay. 550 Dakota Verbs. Minnesota Historical Society Press, 2005. .
 Simcikova, Karla. To live fully, here and now: the healing vision in the works of Alice Walker. Lexington Books, 2006. .
 Staub, Michael E. Voices of Persuasion: Politics of Representation in 1930s America. Cambridge, UK: University of Cambridge Press, 1994. .

External links

Lakota culture
Pejorative terms for white people
Native American slang
Racism in Canada
Xenophobia in North America
Lakota words and phrases